Prince Imperial may refer to the Crown Prince in the following monarchies:
 Prince Imperial of Brazil
 Prince Imperial of France, especially:
 Napoléon, Prince Imperial
 Prince Imperial of Mexico

See also 
 Prince Imperial Memorial, a memorial cross built on the site of the death of Napoleon, Prince Imperial in South Africa
 Prince Royal (disambiguation), a similar style denoting the heirs apparent to certain other monarchies
 Railway of the Prince Imperial, the first documented model railway in the world